LIU Baseball Stadium is a baseball stadium in Brookville, New York. It is the home field of Long Island University Sharks college baseball team. The field served as the home field of the LIU Post Pioneers baseball team until 2019. In 2019, LIU Post and LIU Brooklyn merged athletic programs and became the LIU Sharks. These two programs established that they would host games at what was LIU Post's home field.

See also
 List of NCAA Division I baseball venues

References

External links
LIU Baseball Stadium

LIU Sharks baseball
Baseball venues in New York City